Leiostyla lamellosa is an extinct species of small air-breathing land snail, a terrestrial pulmonate gastropod mollusk in the family Lauriidae.

This species is mentioned in Annexes II and IV of the Habitats Directive.

Distribution
This species was endemic to Madeira, Portugal.

References

Leiostyla
Extinct gastropods
Gastropods described in 1852